League of Socialists of the National Movement of Iran or Society of Iranian Socialists was a socialist nationalist party in Iran.

The party formally joined the Socialist International upon establishment.

It was founded in 1960 by Third Force activists led by Khalil Maleki and a number of radical nationalists, most of whom had social democracy leanings and some members with Islamic socialism tendencies. Hossein Malek, Ahmad Sayyed Javadi and Jalal Al-e-Ahmad were among people associated with the group.

The organization was a founding member of the National Front (II) and was considered the "extereme left-wing" within the front. It broke with the front and joined the National Democratic Front after the Iranian Revolution. In the 1980 Iranian presidential election, the group supported People's Mujahedin of Iran nominee Massoud Rajavi.

References

1960 establishments in Iran
1980s disestablishments in Iran
Defunct nationalist parties
Defunct political parties of the Islamic Republic of Iran
Defunct social democratic parties
Defunct socialist parties in Iran
Former member parties of the Socialist International
Iranian nationalism
Left-wing nationalist parties
National Front (Iran) affiliated parties
Nationalist parties in Iran
Political parties disestablished in the 1980s
Political parties established in 1960
Political parties in Pahlavi Iran (1941–1979)
Political parties of the Iranian Revolution
Secularism in Iran
Social democratic parties in Asia